At least two ships of the Argentine Navy have been named King:

 , a minesweeper previously the German M-53 and renamed on transfer in 1922. She was decommissioned in 1937.
 , a  launched in 1943.

Argentine Navy ship names